Savina Cuéllar Leaños (born 30 January 1963) is a Bolivian politician who formerly as governor of the Department of Chuquisaca. She is of Quechua ancestry and one of the leading oppositionists to president Evo Morales.
2006 she joined the Bolivian Constituent Assembly of 2006-2007 as an Evo Morales-supporter but changed sides over the question of whether Sucre or La Paz should be the capital of the country.

References

1963 births
Living people
21st-century Bolivian politicians
21st-century Bolivian women politicians
Bolivian people of Quechua descent
Bolivian politicians of indigenous peoples descent
Members of the Bolivian Constituent Assembly
Movement for Socialism (Bolivia) politicians
People from Yamparáez Province
Quechua politicians
Social Democratic Movement politicians